The rakkopilli is a type of bagpipe, with no drone with a bagpipe made of a pig's bladder, from the Votic region.

References

Finnish musical instruments
Bagpipes
Votians